Alexander Alexeyevich Chekalin (b. 6 September 1947) was the First Deputy Minister of the Interior of Russia from 2000 to 2008. He expressed his support for mass arrests of protestors in the week leading up to the 32nd G8 summit, which was held in St. Petersburg from 15 - 17 July 2006.

Honours and awards
 Hero of the Russian Federation (2000)
 Order of Merit for the Fatherland, 3rd class (2008) and 4th class (2004)
 Order of Honour (2006)
 Order of Friendship (2006)
 Order of the Badge of Honour (1986)
 Medals of the Order of Merit for the Fatherland, 1st class (1998) and 2nd class (1995)
 Order of Saint Righteous Grand Duke Dmitry Donskoy, 2nd class (Russian Orthodox Church, 2007)
 Candidate of Legal Sciences
 Honored Worker of the Interior Ministry
 Honorary Worker of the Interior Ministry
 Honorary Member of Russian Academy of Arts
 Medal "In Commemoration of the 850th Anniversary of Moscow"
 Medal "In Commemoration of the 300th Anniversary of Saint Petersburg"
 Medal of Merit in the conduct of national census

External links
 Brief biography of Alexander Chekalin

References

1947 births
Living people
Members of the Federation Council of Russia (after 2000)
Heroes of the Russian Federation
Recipients of the Order "For Merit to the Fatherland", 3rd class
Recipients of the Order of Honour (Russia)
Honorary Members of the Russian Academy of Arts
Recipients of the Medal of the Order "For Merit to the Fatherland" I class
Recipients of the Medal of the Order "For Merit to the Fatherland" II class
Kutafin Moscow State Law University alumni